Jokin Ezkieta Mendiburu is a Spanish footballer who plays as a goalkeeper for Racing de Santander.

Club career
Born in Pamplona, Navarre, Ezkieta represented Osasuna as a youth. He made his senior debut with the reserves on 24 August 2014, starting in a 2–0 away win against CD Corellano in the Tercera División.

In March 2015, as his contract was due to expire, Ezkieta agreed to a contract with Barcelona. The deal was made official on 17 July, with the player signing a four-year deal and being assigned to the B-side in the Segunda División B.

On 22 July 2016, Ezkieta was loaned to fellow third division side Sabadell, for one year. An undisputed starter, he contributed with 37 appearances (3,330 minutes of action) as his side narrowly avoided relegation.

Ezkieta subsequently returned to Barça and its reserve team, at the time in the Segunda División. He made his professional debut on 25 September 2017, starting in a 2–1 home loss against Lugo. His sole call-up to the first team in La Liga was for the 1–0 win at Real Valladolid the following 23 August, taking Jasper Cillessen's place on the bench due to the Dutchman's rib injury.

On 1 July 2019, free agent Ezkieta signed a four-year contract with Athletic Bilbao, with a release clause set at €45 million. He made his first-team debut on 28 January of the following year, replacing Unai Núñez in the second minute of a 3–3 Copa del Rey last-16 away draw against Tenerife, as Iago Herrerín was sent off; the game went to penalties and he saved from Joselu in a 4–2 win.

Ezkieta made his league debut on the final day of the 2020–21 season in a 2–0 away loss to Elche CF. On 4 July 2022, after spending the previous campaign as a third-choice behind Unai Simón and Julen Agirrezabala, he terminated his contract.

On 5 July 2022, Ezkieta signed a two-year deal with Racing de Santander in the second division.

Career statistics

Honours
Athletic Bilbao
Supercopa de España: 2020–21
Copa del Rey: Runner-up 2019–20, 2020–21

References

External links

1996 births
Living people
Footballers from Pamplona
Spanish footballers
Association football goalkeepers
Segunda División players
Segunda División B players
Tercera División players
CA Osasuna B players
FC Barcelona Atlètic players
CE Sabadell FC footballers
Bilbao Athletic footballers
Athletic Bilbao footballers
Racing de Santander players
Spain youth international footballers